The ranks and insignia used by Russian Ground Forces are inherited from the military ranks of the Soviet Union, although the insignia and uniform has been altered slightly.

Ranks and insignia 
The following is a table ranks of the armed forces of the Russian Federation. English translation is given first, followed by Russian version, then by English transliteration.

Officers

Other ranks 

Rank titles are sometimes modified due to a particular assignment, branch or status:

 The ranks of servicemen assigned to a "guards" unit or formation are preceded by the word "guards";
 The ranks of servicemen in the legal, medical and veterinary branches are followed by "of justice", "of the medical service", and "of the veterinary service", respectively;
 The ranks of servicemen in the reserve or retired are followed by "of the reserve" or "in retirement", respectively;
 The rank descriptor "of aviation" was officially abolished but is still commonly used.

Reforms

Insignia reform (2010) 

On 11 March 2010, Law No.2010-293 of the President of Russia introduced a new set of rank insignia. Privates, airmen and seamen now wear plain shoulder epaulettes. Senior NCOs had their chevrons replaced by plain bars (small horizontal bars for corporals and sergeants increasing in number with seniority, large horizontal bars for staff sergeants, and vertical bars for master sergeants). These rank badges mirror the insignia of both the Imperial Russian Army and the Soviet Army in the 1970s. Warrant officers and officers received new shoulder rank epaulettes and all general officer insignia now reflect service affiliation in the duty dress uniform. The parade dress gold epaulettes have been retained. The insignia for a marshal of the Russian Federation retained the coat of arms of Russia and the marshal's star.

Rank and insignia reform (2013) 
In 2013, the insignia of an army general now include the marshal's star, surmounted by a red star in a wreath. In Spring 2013, the warrant officer ranks, which had been removed as a result of the 2008 Russian military reform, were reinstated.

Insignia reform (2020)

See also 
 History of Russian military ranks
 List of Russian generals killed during the 2022 invasion of Ukraine
 Ranks and insignia of the Russian Federation's armed forces 1994–2010
 Registered Cossack ranks

Explanatory notes

References

Citations

General and cited references

External links
 Federal Law No. 58-FZ from March 12, 1998 "On military duty and military service" (in Russian)
 Presidential Decree No. 531 from May 8, 2005 "On military uniform, rank insignia of the servicemen and state bodies' rank insignia" (in Russian)

 
Russian Federation Army